Markus Menzler (born 25 July 1977) is a German former professional tennis player.

Menzler reached a best singles world ranking of 385 and made an ATP Tour main draw appearance at the 1999 Heineken Trophy in s-Hertogenbosch, where he lost his first round match to sixth seed Jonas Björkman.

Now working as a coach in Herford, Menzler is married to former WTA Tour player Kirstin Freye.

ITF Futures titles

Doubles: (7)

References

External links
 
 

1977 births
Living people
German male tennis players